The 1975 Utah State Aggies football team was an American football team that represented Utah State University as an independent during the 1975 NCAA Division I football season. In their third season under head coach Phil Krueger, the Aggies compiled a 6–5 record and were outscored by opponents by a total of 240 to 193.

Schedule

Roster

References

Utah State
Utah State Aggies football seasons
Utah State Aggies football